The Tonkin weasel or Vietnamese mountain weasel (Mustela tonkinensis) is a species of weasel described by Björkegren in 1941. It is known only from a singular specimen collected from an undisclosed location in Northern Vietnam. Originally believed to be a form of either the least weasel or the yellow-bellied weasel, the species was distinguished as a separate variety on the basis of skull differences by Groves in 2007.

Description 
A standard-sized weasel, the Tonkin weasel measures between 20 and 25 centimetres in body length, with a tail length of between 10 and 11 centimetres. The upper section of the body is medium brown, while the throat, chest and stomach are white in colour. The colouring of the fur is regarded as 'vulgaris-type', which is characterised by an indented demarcation line between the areas of brown and white colour in both the neck and trunk regions. The weasel is distinguished from other species by the size of the narrow skull.

Distribution and habitat 

The recorded specimen is believed to have originated from a mountain range within the Hoàng Liên National Park in the Lào Cai Province. Although Björkegren initially recorded the location of the specimen as in close proximity Sa Pa, it has been concluded by Abramov that the point of origin was more likely to have been from Seo My Ty to the southwest of the town. Thereby, it is probable that the species, if extant, survives within temperate fokienia forest of the sub-alpine highlands of Northern Vietnam.

Behaviour 

In association with other endemic species, it is probable that the Tonkin weasel consumes a similar carnivorous diet. Therefore, it is likely that their diet may consist of birds, insects and other rodents, including Père David's vole and the Eurasian Harvest Mouse. Despite adequate abilities in relation to climbing, it is unlikely that arboreal and scansorial animals would form a portion of their diet.

Population 

The population of the species remains unknown, as it has only been recorded on a single occasion when caught in 1939. It remains possible that concentrations of the population still exist within the higher altitude areas of the Indochina Peninsula, as there is no evidence that, despite extensive land clearing in the region, the weasel is in any way dependent on the temperate forest ecosystem. Despite surveys between 2005 and 2012 which involved numerous discussions with the local Hmong people and forest rangers, no supplementary sightings of the weasel have been reported to date.

Threats

The weasel is believed to be located within a region where hunting in all forms is relatively intense, and it is therefore tenable to suggest that the species may be in decline. The placement of traps to catch other rodents and birds in the highlands may also place the weasel in inadvertent danger. In addition, much of the suggested area of habitation has been prone to fragmentation for agricultural purposes.

References

Mammals of Asia
Weasels
Mammals described in 1941